"Julia" is a song written by John Barlow Jarvis and Don Cook, and it was recorded by American country music artist Conway Twitty.  It was released in March 1987 as the first single from his album Borderline.  The song reached #2 on the Billboard Hot Country Singles & Tracks chart.

Charts

Weekly charts

Year-end charts

References

\

1987 singles
1987 songs
Conway Twitty songs
Songs written by Don Cook
Song recordings produced by Jimmy Bowen
MCA Records singles
Songs written by John Barlow Jarvis